Eguren is a surname. Notable people with the surname include:

 Sebastián Eguren (born 1981), Uruguayan footballer
 José Antonio Eguren, Peruvian Catholic archbishop 
 José María Eguren, Peruvian writer
 Juan Carlos Eguren, Peruvian politician
 Juan José Eguiara y Eguren, Mexican Catholic scholar and bishop

Basque-language surnames